The Hunger is the fifth studio album by American recording artist Michael Bolton. It was released in 1987 by Columbia Records, his third for the label. It became his breakthrough album, producing his first two Top 40 hits, the ballad "That's What Love Is All About" and the Otis Redding cover "(Sittin' On) The Dock of the Bay".

Zelma Redding, the widow of Otis Redding, said Bolton's performance of "(Sittin' On) The Dock of the Bay" moved her so much "that it brought tears to my eyes. It reminded me so much of my husband that I know if he heard it, he would feel the same." In a framed letter that hangs on the wall of Bolton's office, she called the record "my all-time favorite version of my husband's classic."

The album marks a transition from the hard rock and arena rock stylings of his previous work into a softer more pop oriented direction, a transition which would be continued and furthered on his subsequent studio albums.

Several songs from this album feature Journey members Jonathan Cain on keyboards, Neal Schon on guitar, and previous member from their Raised on Radio 1986-87 tour Randy Jackson (of American Idol fame) on bass, with Cain also producing several tracks. During this time, there were rumors that Bolton might have been in the running as Journey's new lead singer after Steve Perry's initial departure from the band in early 1987. Also featured on certain tracks was Bolton's former band-mate and then-current Kiss guitarist Bruce Kulick.

Despite only reaching #46 on the US Billboard 200, the album achieved stability in the charts. After two years, the album was certified Gold in the US (Bolton's first certification of his career), and would subsequently be certified Double Platinum there. In 1990, three years after its initial release, the album entered the UK Albums Chart for the first time and reached its peak of #44, following the success of the album Soul Provider.

Track listing

Chart positions

Singles

Certifications

Production 
 Producers – Keith Diamond (Tracks 1, 4, 5 & 8); Jonathan Cain (Tracks 2, 3, 6 & 7); Susan Hamilton (Track 9).
 Engineers – Acar S. Key (Tracks 1, 4 & 5), Peter Robbins (Tracks 1 & 5), Bob Rosa (Track 1, 4 & 8);  Wally Buck, Jonathan Cain, Bob Missbach, Paul Lani, Jeffey Norman, Larry Hines, Tom Anderson, Jamie Bridges and Michael Rosen (Tracks 2, 3, 6 & 7); J.C. Convertino and Don Peterkofsky (Track 5); Ron St. Germain, Scott James, Jon Smith, Jon Wolfson and Jackie Brown (Track 9).
 Additional Engineering – Dave Dachinger (Tracks 1 & 8); Mark Cobrin (Track 8).
 Assistant Engineers – Barbara Milne (Track 1); Bob Broockman (Tracks 1 & 8); (Ken) K.C. Collins (Tracks 1, 4 & 5); Ed Bruder (Tracks 1, 5 & 8); George Karras (Tracks 1, 4 & 5); Tom Vercillo (Tracks 1 & 8); Jay Healy (Track 8).
 Second Engineers on Tracks 2, 3, 6 & 7 – Rob Beaton and Jim Champagne.
 Additional Engineering and Pre-Production – Dave Dale
 Mixing – Keith Diamond and Bob Rosa (Tracks 1, 4, 5 & 8); Ron St. Germain (Tracks 2 & 9); Kevin Elson (Tracks 3, 6 & 7).
 Mix Assistant on Track 9 – Debi Cornish
 Mixed at Soundtrack Studios, Right Track Recording and Unique Recording Studios (New York, NY); Fantasy Studios (Berkeley, CA).
 Mastered by Bob Ludwig at Masterdisk (New York, NY).
 Art Direction – Christopher Austopchuk
 Front Photo – Harris Savides
 Back Photo – Hans Neleman
 Management – Contemporary Communications Corp.
 Direction – Louis Levin

Personnel
 Michael Bolton – lead vocals, backing vocals (1, 4-8)
 Keith Diamond – keyboards (1, 4, 5, 8), Fairlight CMI (1, 5, 8), bass (1, 4, 5, 8), drums (1, 4, 5, 8), Linn 9000 programming (4)
 Jeff Neiblum – programming (1, 8)
 Jonathan Cain – keyboards (2, 3, 6, 7)
 Jeff Bova – additional keyboards (4, 8)
 Bobby Khozouri – programming (4)
 Steve Rimland – Fairlight programming (4)
 Skip Anderson – additional keyboards (5)
 Kenn Fink – Fairlight CMI programming (5)
 Ned Liben – Fairlight CMI Series III programming (5, 8)
 Rob Mounsey – keyboards (9), string arrangements (9)
 Bruce Kulick – guitar (1, 8), second guitar solo (1)
 Paul Pesco – guitar (1, 5, 8), first guitar solo (1)
 Ira Siegel – guitar (1, 4, 5), acoustic guitar (5), electric guitar (9)
 Neal Schon – guitar (2, 3, 7)
 Bob Halligan Jr. – guitar (4), backing vocals (4)
 Danny Merlin – guitar (6)
 Timmy Allen – bass (1)
 Randy Jackson – bass (2, 3, 6, 7)
 Doug Wimbish – bass (4)
 Will Lee – bass (9)
 Mike Baird –  drums (2, 3, 7)
 Mugs Cain – drums (6), percussion (7), drum programming (7)
 Chris Parker – drums (9)
 Danny Hull – saxophone (2)
 Jerry Jumonville – saxophone (3)
 Bobby Martin – saxophone (3)
 Tom Peterson – saxophone (3)
 V. Jeffrey Smith – saxophone (8)
 Alex Foster – alto flute (5)
 Lenny Pickett – reeds (5)
 Steve Madaio – trumpet (3)
 Vicki Genfan – music contractor (1, 4, 5, 8)
 Tara Shanahan – music contractor (5)
 Leon Pendarvis – horn arrangements, string arrangements and conductor (5)
 Barbara Markay – music copyist (5)
 Jesse Levy and Fredrick Zlotkin – cello (5)
 Karen Dreyfus, Katsuko Esaki, Richard Hendrickson, Harold Kohon, Anthony Posk and Rebecca Young – violin (5)
 Joe Cerisano – backing vocals (1) 
 Dennis Feldman – backing vocals (1, 4)
 Curtis King Jr. – backing vocals (1)
 Joe Lynn Turner – backing vocals (1, 4)
 David Glen Eisley – backing vocals (2, 3, 7)
 Lynette Hawkins Stephens – backing vocals (2, 6)
 Walter Hawkins – backing vocals (2, 6)
 James Ingram – backing vocals (2, 3)
 Shaun Murphy – backing vocals (2, 3, 6)
 Jeanie Tracy – backing vocals (2, 6)
 Eric Martin – backing vocals (7)

Cover versions
Marc Anthony would later cover "Walk Away" with Little Louie Vega for their 1991 album When the Night is Over.
 Sunstorm, who are fronted by Joe Lynn Turner (who sang backing vocals on "Hot Love" and "Gina"), covered "Gina" for their 2012 album Emotional Fire.
 Dutch singer Gordon recorded "Walk Away" for his 1994 album Now Is the Time.

References

Michael Bolton albums
1987 albums
Columbia Records albums
Albums produced by Jonathan Cain